W Series is an all-female single-seater racing championship. The series' first season was in 2019; it featured twenty drivers contesting six races.

History
The W Series was publicly launched on 10 October 2018. Rumours about the creation of a female-only racing series had begun to circulate in November 2017. It was created in response to the lack of female drivers progressing to the highest levels of motorsport, particularly Formula 1.

The series has the backing of a number of prominent members of the motorsport community, including former F1 driver David Coulthard and engineer Adrian Newey.

The inaugural season in 2019 was run in support of the 2019 Deutsche Tourenwagen Masters, a touring car championship based in Germany, and all cars were operated by Hitech GP. It consisted of six rounds that were held at six different circuits, two in Germany and four in other European countries.

The calendar for the 2020 W Series was announced in early 2020. The initial drivers' list confirmed that the top twelve finishers from the 2019 championship were automatically qualified for the 2020 series. The 2020 season was cancelled due to the COVID-19 pandemic and a 10-event eSports series was held on the iRacing platform in its place.

The 2021 W Series featured eight races, and was run in support of the 2021 Formula One World Championship. The 2022 W Series continued to be run in support of Formula One, and was initially scheduled to feature eight races as well. The calendar was later expanded to feature ten races, including double-headers to start and finish the season.

After the sixth race of the 2022 season, however, it was reported that the series was facing significant financial difficulties, as reported in the recent company accounts filed with Companies House on 5 September 2022, which showed that it had net liabilities of over £7.5 million to 31 December 2021, with debts to a number of creditors, including Whisper, the media production company owned by Jake Humphrey and David Coulthard, and Velocity Experience, the company that provides hospitality services to the series. Doubts were expressed whether it would be able to complete the 2022 season. These doubts were realized on 10 October 2022, a week after the seventh race of the season, which had been moved from Suzuka to Singapore, resulting in the cancellation of the remaining three races, which included a single race at Circuit of the Americas and a double-header at Autódromo Hermanos Rodríguez, due to financial issues. CEO Catherine Bond Muir expressed confidence that the series would return in 2023.

Championship format 

The series features eighteen female racers from around the globe, plus two reserve drivers. The drivers were selected through a selection process that began with fifty-four participants.

The W Series championship title is awarded to the competitor with the highest number of points from all qualifying rounds run, excluding any penalty points incurred. If two or more drivers finish the season with the same number of points, the higher place in the series shall be awarded to the driver with the highest number of race wins. If the number of race wins is the same, the championship title shall be awarded according to the number of second-place finishes, third-place finishes and so on.

The 15 Super Licence points for the champion are fewer than those awarded for winning the various Formula Regional championships, other series that use the same machinery as W Series.

Points system 
Points were awarded to the top ten classified finishers as follows:

Cars 

The W Series features mechanically identical cars. In 2018, it was announced that the inaugural 2019 season would use the Tatuus-Alfa Romeo F3 T-318, homologated by the FIA for use in Formula 3 in Formula Regional European Championship, powered by Autotecnica Motori-tuned Alfa Romeo 1.8-litre turbocharged engines, and equipped with a halo cockpit safety device.

For 2022, to keep the carbon footprint as low as possible by using sea freight, the Toyota Racing Series will ship 18 Tatuus–Toyota F3 FT-60 cars to be used at the Circuit de Barcelona-Catalunya in May and to Singapore in October.

Chassis construction: Carbon-fibre monocoque
Engine displacement:  DOHC inline-4
Aspiration: Single-turbocharged
Fuel delivery: Direct fuel injection
Fuel capacity: 
Fuel: Aral Ultimate 102 RON unleaded
Weight: 
Power output: 
Width: 
Wheelbase: 
Gearbox: Sadev 6-speed paddle-shift gearbox + 1 reverse
Steering: Power-assisted rack-and-pinion

Champions

Circuits 

 Bold denotes a current Formula One Circuit.
 Italic denotes a former Formula One Circuit.

Funding structure 
The inaugural W Series Championship is free to enter; competitors are not required to bring any sponsorship.

The championship offers a total prize fund of $1.5 million, with the series champion receiving a top prize of $500,000, and the remaining $1 million being divided among the rest of the drivers.

Media coverage 

W Series race coverage was initially available on Channel 4 in the UK. The show was presented by long-time F1 journalist and sports presenter Lee McKenzie who shared the duties with fellow presenter Anna Woolhouse and joined by 2019 W-Series driver Naomi Schiff as studio analyst. Channel 4's Formula One commentator Alex Jacques replaced Claire Cottingham as the series' lead race commentator, with former Formula One driver David Coulthard and double-amputee driver Billy Monger in co-commentary roles and both Ted Kravitz and Amy Reynolds acting as pit-lane reporters. Both Jacques and Monger were forced to miss the opening two rounds of 2021 after Billy Monger tested positive for COVID-19, therefore Ben Edwards had substituted as lead commentator for  Alex.

W Series races are live-streamed on Facebook, YouTube and/or Twitter in countries without television broadcasts.

In May 2022, Sky Sports UK announced it had obtained exclusive live broadcast rights for three years. A broadcast partnership was also made with Sky Italia. In the UK, Channel 4 now show only race highlights, with the exception of the Silverstone race which will show live coverage alongside Sky.

Criticism 

The W Series has faced criticism since it was publicly announced, with opponents of the series claiming the category segregated female racers rather than promoting their inclusion in established series.

British IndyCar Series driver Pippa Mann responded to the series’ announcement on Twitter, saying "What a sad day for motorsport. Those with funding to help female racers are choosing to segregate them as opposed to supporting them. I am deeply disappointed to see such an historic step backwards take place in my life time."

Mann's views on segregation were echoed by Charlie Martin, who stated "This series is founded on segregation, and while it may create opportunities for some female drivers, it sends a clear message that segregation is acceptable. We don’t discriminate in sport based on race, so it is particularly jarring that we feel it is acceptable to do so based on gender in 2018. As racers, we want to compete against the best drivers – regardless of age, race, sexual orientation or gender – and prove we are the best at what we do."

Former Formula E and ex-Sauber F1 Test Driver Simona de Silvestro has suggested that the $1.5 million prize fund would be better invested in a scholarship system to support the development of talent across a wider range of motorsport disciplines. "If there’s really that much money going into the series, there are a few girls that have been pretty competitive in junior series. It seems like everyone is just struggling to get the shot. If you look at a Red Bull affiliation or a Mercedes affiliation, somehow these kids always get into the best teams and then they’re winning. I think, personally, it would have been better to do something like the Red Bull programme and make sure some girls get an opportunity on a really good team."

Claire Williams, at that time deputy team principal of the Williams Formula One team, was initially highly critical of the series, and felt it was analogous to segregation; however she later retracted this statement, and praised the series for promoting women in motorsports.

The 2019, 2021 and 2022 champion, Jamie Chadwick, was invited into the Williams Driver Academy.

See also 
List of W Series drivers
Formula Woman
F1 Academy

References

External links 

W Series championship website

 
2019 establishments in Europe
2019 establishments in North America
Open wheel racing
One-make series